Otholobium swartbergense is a small spreading shrub assigned to the Pea family. All green parts are covered in hairs. It has many slender stems that are woody at their base, alternately set clover-like leaves and heads consisting of 6-15 mauve to purple, pea-like flowers on long peduncles in the axils of the leaves. This species is an endemic of the Swartberg mountains in the Western Cape province of South Africa. It mostly flowers in November and December.

Taxonomy 
Specimen of this small shrublet were first collected by the famous South African botanist Harry Bolus in 1904, high on the northern slopes of the Swartberg Pass. In 1986, Charles Stirton considered it sufficiently different from other Otholobium species, in particular O. sericeum, to distinguish and name it O. swartbergense. No synonyms are known. The name of the genus Otholobium is a combination of the Greek words ὠθέω (ōthéō) meaning to push and λοβός (lobos) meaning pod, which Stirton selected because its fruit seems to be pushed out of the calyx.

Description 
Otholobium swartbergense is a small spreading shrublet, with numerous slender stems that are covered in short hairs pointing toward the growing point and - particularly on the ribs - interspersed with longer, patent hairs. The surface of the leaflets is silky hairy, more so on the lower surface and in particular along the veins. Leaflets become larger in leaves that are produced later in the growth season. The two leaflets to the sides are smaller than the one in the middle.

Each head consist of 2-5 triplets of flowers, the lowest of which is subtended by a semi-circular, hairy bract that divides in 2 or 3 teeth. These bracts gradually get narrower for triplets implanted further to the tip of the petiole. As in all Faboideae, the corolla is zygomorphic, forms a specialized structure and consists of 5 free petals. The corollas are initially mauve in colour but become purple with age. The upper petal, called the banner or standard, is large and envelops the other petals in the bud. The standard gradually curves back along its length. The wings are longer than and enclose the 2 bottom petals, which together are called the keel. The two keel petals have long claws and form a boat-like structure. The keel contains 10 filaments. The anthers are alternately fixed to their filament at the base and at midlength.

Distribution and conservation 
Otholobium swartbergense is considered a near-threatened species because it is known from six locations only and may suffer from competition by invasive plants. Here it grows on sandstone slopes along seeps and on the bank of streamlets in a vegetation type called Sandstone Fynbos.

References

External links 
 more photos

Psoraleeae
Endemic flora of South Africa
Plants described in 1986